Russky Invalid (Русский инвалид), where invalid has the meaning of a military veteran, was a newspaper of the Russian military which was published in Saint Petersburg, Russian Empire, in 1813–1917. It was founded by Pavel Pezarovius, its first editor (1813-1821, 1839-1847), originally as a charity publication collecting funds to support the victims of the 1812 War and their families of the perished. Russky Invalid started out as a weekly, in 1814—1815 it was coming out twice a week, and since 1816 became a daily. Highly popular was the Literary Supplement to Russian Invalid.
 
In July 1917 the newspaper changed its name to The Army and the Navy of Free Russia (Армия и флот свободной России) but even despite of that was closed in October of that year.  It was renewed in 1992 in Moscow by the journalist Nikolai Zhukov, as the charity publication.

External links 
"Russky Invalid" digital archives in "Newspapers on the web and beyond", the digital resource of the National Library of Russia

References 

Military newspapers published in the Russian Empire
Publications established in 1813
Defunct newspapers published in Russia
Publications disestablished in 1917
Mass media in Saint Petersburg
Defunct weekly newspapers
Russian-language newspapers